Htamanè (also spelt htamane) is a glutinous rice-based savory snack, and a seasonal festive delicacy in Myanmar. The traditional delicacy is ceremonially prepared around and on the full moon day of Tabodwe, the 11th lunar month on the traditional Burmese calendar (roughly in February), just as the cool season ends. Some pagodas and monasteries, including the Shwedagon Pagoda, hold htamane-making competitions.

Preparation
The preparation begins with washing and soaking white and purple (nga cheik) glutinous rice. In a giant wide wok on a low stove, the glutinous rice is kneaded, crushed and boiled with water and ground nut oil until it becomes a thick blackish grey paste.

The wok is lowered from the stove on to a small wooden block to hold it. Once there, the mixing process which is the main feature of making Htamanè begins. Typically, three people (almost always stout men) are involved in the mixing process. Two men each with giant wooden spatulas resembling rowing paddles begin to mix the glutinous dough while a third coordinates the two spatulas, often by holding on to it near the pot. Towards the end of the mixing process, toasted sesame seeds, peanut, fried ginger, ground nut oil and fried coconut shavings are added to the wok. These ingredients become evenly mixed with the dough paste. Once a batch of Htamanè has been prepared, more fried coconut shavings, peanuts and sesame seeds are added as garnishes.

Htamanè is usually made at monasteries and specialized shops to accommodate the quantity and space requirements. A small portion is taken first as an offering to the Buddha as per custom and then it is usually sent around in the neighbourhood, to family and friends as a festival gift.
The taste of Htamane is Sweet.

References

See also
 Glutinous rice
 Cuisine of Burma
 List of Burmese dishes

Burmese cuisine
Glutinous rice dishes
Mon people